Clean money may refer to:

 Money for publicly funded elections
 Money that appears to have been acquired legitimately; see Money laundering